Saint James School is an independent boarding and day school in the U.S. state of Maryland. Founded in 1842 as the College and Grammar School of St. James's, the school is a coeducational college preparatory school and the oldest Episcopal boarding school in the United States founded as a boarding school proper.

History
Saint James is the second iteration of a type of school conceived by William Augustus Muhlenberg (1796–1877), who founded model schools on Long Island in 1828 and 1836. The founding Rector of Saint James was John Barrett Kerfoot (1816–1881), who was Muhlenberg's principal disciple for thirteen years before Muhlenberg sent him to Western Maryland to extend the mission. The models established at Flushing and College Point, Long Island, and in St. James, Maryland, were the mother lode for much subsequent prospecting. Graduates and staff from Saint James founded St. Paul's (The Rev. Joseph H. Coit, M.A.), Concord, New Hampshire, St. Mark's, Southborough, Massachusetts; and several other schools. Racine College in Wisconsin (1852) was modeled on Saint James and its celebrated rector James DeKoven recruited faculty from Saint James.

Administration
Saint James is one of twenty-four Episcopal Schools in the Diocese of Maryland. The school is governed by a board of trustees. A Prefect Council, made up of ten seniors elected by the students and the faculty, upholds the traditions of Saint James and assists faculty members and the Headmaster in the day-to-day operations of the School. Of this group, one member is elected Senior Prefect, and he or she leads the Prefects.

The Sacristans and Chapel Vestry assist in the liturgy of daily services. The Senior Sacristan is the second ranking position for students on campus, following the Senior Prefect, and is the chief student assistant to the Chaplain, currently the Rev. Dr. Brandt Montgomery.
Saint James School is accredited by the Middle States Association of Colleges and the Maryland State Department of Education. The school is a member of: the National Association of Independent Schools, the Association of Independent Maryland Schools, Cum Laude Society, the Council for Advancement and Support of Education, and the National Association of Episcopal Schools.

Sex abuse 

In the 1980s, several boarding students were sexually abused by Father Kenneth Behrel, a teacher. The school dismissed Behrel. Prosecutors in a trial that eventually resulted in Behrel's imprisonment found that the school bore some responsibility.

Campus
Saint James School is situated in a rural area. The Georgian-style buildings are in  farmland containing a natural spring, fields, and streams. Total acreage exceeds 800 acres.

Claggett Hall: The largest boys' dorm on campus, Claggett houses over 60 fourth-, fifth-, and sixth-formers as well as several faculty members.
Kemp Hall: The campus student center.
Powell Hall: The main academic building with over 20 classrooms.
John E. Owens Library.
Kerfoot Refectory.
Laidlaw Infirmary.
Cotton Building and the Bowman Fine Arts Center: The Fine Arts Center houses the auditorium, which seats about 300. This building includes music study rooms, the art studio/yearbook room, and a Choir room. The Mummer's Society puts on several plays every year, including a fall drama, a spring musical, senior-directed plays, and the Christmas Tradition of St. George and the Dragon.
Alumni Hall: Alumni Hall houses two wrestling rooms, two dance studios, a weight room, locker rooms, and a field house. The field house contains three basketball courts which can be converted into four tennis courts or two volleyball courts.
The Chapel.
Mattingly Hall: A dorm for third- and fourth-form boys. Hershey Hall was renovated in the spring of 2006 and renamed Mattingly Hall in honor of John M. Mattingly '58.
Onderdonk Hall: A dorm for second- and third-form boys.
Holloway House: The fourth-, fifth- and sixth-form girls' dorm.
Coors Hall: A dorm for second-, third-, and fourth-form girls.
Bai Yuka: The school's water source, the Bai Yuka is a natural spring that runs through campus and whose name is Native American for "fountain rock".
Biggs Rectory: The headmaster's house was completed in 2002.

Notable alumni
Samuel S. Carroll Commander of the famed Gibraltar Brigade
Grant Golden, basketball player, currently for the University of Richmond Spiders
James L. Holloway III Former Chief of Naval Operations, Admiral USN, Ret.
James M. Jasper Author, professor, and sociologist
Foster MacKenzie III, Deceased Boogie/Rock/Blues Musician
Alfred Thayer Mahan, 1856, naval strategist.
Daniel Robinson Jr., American steel-string guitarist
Robert Jenkins Onderdonk 1870, Texas artist and father of Julian Onderdonk (1882–1922), the "father of Texas painting"
Bertram Wyatt-Brown (1932–2012), Milbauer Professor of History, University of Florida; noted Americanist and author of Southern Honor.
Justin Robinson, Professional basketball player for the Washington Wizards
Joseph J. Himmel, Jesuit missionary and president of Georgetown University
Thomas Richey, Anglo-Catholic priest and professor
John Metchie III, American football wide receiver for the Houston Texans of the National Football League

References 
 David Hein, editor. Religion and Politics in Maryland on the Eve of the Civil War: The Letters of W. Wilkins Davis. Eugene, OR: Wipf & Stock, 2009. (An updated version of a book published in 1988 in hardcover as A Student's View of the College of St. James on the Eve of the Civil War.)
 David Hein, "The High Church Origins of the American Boarding School."  Journal of Ecclesiastical History 42 (1991): 577-95.
 Herbert B. Adams, editor. History of Education in Maryland, 1894, pp 258–260 by Reverend Hall Harrison
   Life of the Right Reverend John Barrett Kerfoot, D.D. L.L.D., First Bishop of Pittsburgh, by Hall Harrison, M.A., Vol. 1, pp. 46 – 48, published by James Pott & Co., New York 1886 (Google Books)
 Civil War Diary of Joseph H. Coit, Maryland Historical Magazine, volume 60. p 245 (edited by James McLachlan).
 James S. McLachlan, "American Boarding Schools: A Historical Study" (New York: Scribners, 1970). 
 W.L. Prehn, "Episcopal Schools," The Praeger Handbook of Faith-Based Schools in the United States, Vol I, edited by Thomas C. Hunt and James C. Carper (Santa Barbara, Denver, and Oxford UK: ABC-Clio/Praeger, 2012); 76-89.
 W.L. Prehn, Editor, Saint James School of Maryland:  175 Years  (Eugene, OR: Wipf & Stock, 2021).
W.L. Prehn, "Social Vision, Character, and Academic Excellence in Nineteenth-Century America: William Augustus Muhlenberg and the Church School Movement, 1828-1877." Ph.D dissertation, University of Virginia (2005). Chapters on Kerfoot and Saint James.
 The David K.M. Prehn Collection in the Saint James School Archives is a growing resource for the study of the Church school movement on both sides of the Atlantic and of high-quality faith-based education in general. The Collection features original primary documents or copies thereof related to W.A. Muhlenberg's model schools on Long Island; documents useful for the study of the schools founded by Muhlenberg's proteges, especially Kerfoot, Lloyd Breck, and Henry Coit of St. Paul's; histories of prep schools in the United Kingdom and the United States; biographies of Church school headmasters and other staff; and articles and monographs addressing the historical context and conditions in which the pan-Atlantic Church school arose. In this Collection the researcher may get a better idea of the relationship between the 19th-century "Church Revival" and the school-founding phenomenon.

References

External links 
Official St. James School Homepage

Boarding schools in Maryland
Christianity in Hagerstown, Maryland
Private high schools in Maryland
Educational institutions established in 1842
Episcopal schools in Maryland
Schools in Hagerstown, Maryland
Episcopal church buildings in Maryland
1842 establishments in Maryland